Arthur Gordon Pilbrow (18 May 1902 – 16 July 1987) was a British fencer.

Fencing career
He competed at the 1936 and 1948 Summer Olympics.

He represented England and won three gold medals in fencing at the 1950 British Empire Games in Auckland, New Zealand. He was a four times British fencing champion, winning the sabre title at the British Fencing Championships in 1932, 1935, 1938 and 1950.

References

1902 births
1987 deaths
British male fencers
Olympic fencers of Great Britain
Fencers at the 1936 Summer Olympics
Fencers at the 1948 Summer Olympics
People from Bromley
Sportspeople from London
Commonwealth Games medallists in fencing
Commonwealth Games gold medallists for England
Fencers at the 1950 British Empire Games
Medallists at the 1950 British Empire Games